"Sweet Lady" is a song by British rock band Queen, which was written by Queen guitarist Brian May.

Details
"Sweet Lady" is a distortion-driven fast rocker written by May. The song is an unusual rock style in 3/4 meter (which gives way to 4/4 at the bridge).

According to an online source, Roger Taylor once said that because of its unusual time signature, "Sweet Lady" was the hardest song for him to play live on the drums.

The backing track was probably recorded live, as one can hear the wires on the snare drum of Taylor's kit vibrating along with John Deacon's bass guitar riff.

Comments

Live performances
"Sweet Lady" was first performed live on the A Night at the Opera Tour in November 1975. It was one of only three songs from the soon to be released album (A Night At The Opera) to be performed live (the others being "Bohemian Rhapsody" and "The Prophet's Song"). The band were still completing the album a week before it was to be released, so they only had a couple of days to rehearse.

The song would remain on Queen's live set to its last performance in June 1977. Like many Queen tracks performed live, the song has never been released on an official live album.

Legacy
The song's line "You call me sweet like I'm some kind of cheese" was mentioned in the 2018 Queen biopic Bohemian Rhapsody during an argument between Taylor (Ben Hardy) and May (Gwilym Lee) about "I'm in Love with My Car", wherein Taylor asks May about the song's content, gets the lyrics, and derisively reads "You call me sweet like I'm some kind of cheese".

Personnel
Freddie Mercury - lead and backing vocals
Brian May - electric guitar, backing vocals
Roger Taylor - drums, backing vocals
John Deacon - bass guitar

References

Queen (band) songs
Songs written by Brian May
1975 songs
British hard rock songs